The Cachena is a breed of triple-purpose cattle from Portugal and Galicia, Spain. In Portugal, there is also the similar but larger cattle breed known by the name, Barrosão or Barrosã. Cachena and Barrosã are sometimes considered variants of the same race.

Ancestry and description 
Cachena cattle were bred from brown and yellow local cattle in Northern Portugal and Galicia (Spain).
They are light brown to yellow with dark brown nuances around the withers. The mucosas are unpigmented except of the dark muzzle. The wide and long horns are lyre-shaped. Cachena cattle are one of the smallest cattle breeds of the world: The height must be equal or less than 110 cm (both in cows and bulls, with the last ones, being normally taller). Bulls weigh around 550 kg, cows 390 kg.

Distribution 
Cachena cattle were originally bred in the Vila Real District, an agriculturally poor district in the extreme north of Portugal, and later were exported to Galicia (Spain). Climate is hot and dry in summer, cold and humid in winter. The grounds are arduous and little fertile. The Cachena cattle are distributed around the low mountain range regions of the communities in the Spanish natural park Baixa Limia-Serra do Xurés in the frontier region to Portugal. In addition they are spread in the region around the Ourensic village Olelas and in the Portuguese Peneda-Gerês National Park.

Use 

Originally, Cachena cattle were a triple-purpose cattle breed, being used as a draft animal, for milk and for meat.  Nowadays they are only used for beef production. The beef is known for its excellent quality. The Cachena cow produces a little amount of milk that is of markedly good taste because of the wild herbs of the range, quasi-perfumed. It is refined to the cheese named "Brandas da Cachena". The beef is a Portuguese Protected Designation of Origin named "Carne Cachena da Peneda".

Cachena is a very rustic breed, excellently adapted to its environment. The Cachena cattle keep well when allowed to free range. Their good sense of smell helps them to search for rare herbs in the bushland. The cows are very good mothers and treat their calves exemplarily. Their small height may be an adaption to the hostile environment: a small cow needs less energy and survives famines.

Protection 
There were only 30 Cachena cattle extant in 1986. Five years later, there were 260 cattle. In Portugal, a plan for maintenance of domesticated animals in danger of extinction was made. By 2013, there were over 4700 cattle thriving in 165 herds. A Cachena cattle herdbook was founded in the year 2000.

Reference 

Cattle breeds
Portuguese products with protected designation of origin
Agriculture in Spain
Cattle breeds originating in Portugal